Stephen Evans (born 27 November 1970) is a British actor and comedy writer in theatre, film, radio and television. He graduated with a BA (Hons) degree in Theatre at Dartington College of Arts in Devon  (1992–95).

Member of five-man comedy sketch group Dutch Elm Conservatoire. Nominated for the Perrier Award at the 2005 Edinburgh Festival Fringe for the show Dutch Elm Conservatoire in Conspiracy.
The Dutch Elm Conservatoire performed their last live show Prison at the 2006 Edinburgh Festival Fringe and the Belfast theatre festival in November 2006 .

External links
AHA-Talent agent

1970 births
British writers
Living people
Welsh male stage actors
Welsh male film actors
Welsh male television actors